Parque de las Acacias de Algeciras is a park in Algeciras, southeastern Spain.
 The Museo municipal de Algeciras lies to the north and Villa Smith lies in the southern part of the park. The historic Hotel Reina Cristina overlooks the park on its western side.

References

Parks in Algeciras